The Jardins d'Albertas are private, 18th-century gardens à la française in the town of Bouc-Bel-Air in the Bouches-du-Rhône department of France.  They are classified by the French Ministry of Culture as one of the Remarkable Gardens of France.

Description 
The gardens combine Italian inspiration and the classic French garden style.  The terrace has fountains fed by four springs; the garden is ornamented with statues of Hercules, David, two gladiators, and eight tritons, and has a grand canal, a grotto, and a mill.

History
The land where the gardens are located has belonged to the Albertas family since 1673.  The gardens were originally created in 1751 by Jean-Baptiste Albertas, the first president of the cour des comptes of the town of Aix-en-Provence.  In 1790, on July 14, the first anniversary of the French Revolution, he was assassinated  by Anicet Martel from Auriol. His son was made a Pair of France by King Louis XVIII, and became Prefet of the Bouches-du-Rhône. 

The gardens fell into disrepair in the first half of the 20th century, and were restored beginning in 1949 by Jean d'Albertas.

See also
 Gardens of Provence-Alpes-Côte d'Azur

External links
 page on the site of the French Committee of Parks and Gardens, with photos
 Official site of the gardens

Albertas